The Tidjaniya Caliphate (also known as the Tijaniyya Jihad state or the Segu Tukulor or the Toucouleur Empire) (1861–1890) was founded in the mid-nineteenth century by Elhadj Oumar Foutiyou Tall of the Toucouleur people of Senegal.

History
Omar Tall returned from the Hajj in 1836 with the titles of El Hadj and caliph of the Tijaniyya brotherhood of the Sudan.  After a long stay in Futa Tooro (present day Senegal), he moved to the Fouta Djallon region (in present-day Guinea) in the 1840s. Here, he completed a major work on Tijaniyya scholarship; after this he started to focus on military struggle. Omar Tall planned to conquer new pagan territory for Islam.

Omar Tall managed to bring together a large army of Fulbe and Toucouleur followers and he defeated the states of Tamba (1852), Kaarta Kingdom (1855), Bamana Empire (1861), Massina Empire (1862) and Timbuktu (1863). During the decisive victory in the Battle of Segou on March 10, 1861, he made Segou the capital of his Toucouleur Empire. When Massina was conquered In 1862, Omar Tall left its management to his son Ahmadu Tall to move against the town of Hamdullahi, the capital of the Fula empire of Massina. In 1864, he disappeared in the Bandiagara mountains.

His nephew Tidiani Tall succeeded him and installed the capital of the Toucouleur Empire at Bandiagara. At Segou, Ahmadu Tall continued to reign, successfully suppressing the attempts of several neighboring cities to break away. He came into increasing conflict with his brothers.

In 1890, the French, allied with the Bambara, entered Ségou. Ahmadu Tall fled first to Massina and after his fall in 1893 to Sokoto in present-day Nigeria, marking the effective end of the empire.

Legacy 
A large swath of the Sahel territory that once encompassed the Toucouleur Empire is now today Muslim due to the campaigns of Omar Tall.

See also
Imamate of Futa Toro
List of Sunni Muslim dynasties

References

Further reading
Davidson, Basil. Africa in History. New York: Simon & Schuster, 1995.
Klien, Martin. Slavery and Colonial Rule in French West Africa. Cambridge University Press, 1998. 
Oloruntimeehin, B.O. The Segu Tukulor Empire. New York: Humanities Press, 1972. 
Roberts, Richard L. Warriors, Merchants. and Slaves: The State and the Economy in the Middle Niger Valley, 1700-1914, Stanford University Press, 1987.

External links
African Kingdoms
A Map of the Toucouleur Empire.
The Toucouleur People

 
French West Africa
History of Senegal
States and territories established in 1848
States and territories disestablished in 1893
1836 establishments in Africa
1848 establishments in Africa
1893 disestablishments in Africa
Former empires